Ath Entertainment Pvt. Ltd. is an Indian content production company specialising in film, television and advertising headed by writer and entrepreneur Pankaj Narayan and Apoorva Bajaj. Ath Entertainment has made its mark in television production with its first non fiction show Om Shanti Om - a spiritual singing reality show being broadcast on Star Bharat from 28 August 2017 at Sat-Sun 9:00 PM. Show's concept is brainchild of Pankaj Narayan and produced by Apoorva Bajaj along with him and Colosceum Media Pvt Ltd. Esteemed Panel of Judges on the show includes Sonakshi Sinha, Shekhar Rajviani, Kanika Kapoor along with Swami Ramdev  who is Mahaguru to judge the spiritual quotient in the renditions on the show. Show is hosted by Aparshakti Khurana. Bollywood Superstar Ranveer Singh, Sukhwinder Singh And Rapper Baadshah had graced the occasion and performed on its launch episode and lauded the trendsetting concept of the show where Tradition meets Trendy. 
Ath has made debut in film production with Chal Guru Ho Jaa Shuru released in 2015 and has also produced award-winning documentary, Kitnashak along with various other, ad films and holds portfolio of several companies and NGOs of India, such as Patanjali Yogpeeth. Company has also managed and designed various award shows and known to bring famous Pakistani singer Attaullah Khan Esakhelvi, remembered for his songs 'Acha Sila Diya' and 'Bedardi Se Pyar' to Delhi, for his only concert in India at his peak in the career.

TV Series
 Om Shanti Om

Movies
Chal Guru Ho Jaa Shuru

References

External links
 'Om Shanti Om' Episodes On Hotstar 
 #ओमशांतिओम Promos https://www.youtube.com/playlist?list=PL7hlHltrQx9s_lN_FQ7op47JeHHA9-6U1
 https://www.bhaskar.com/news/BIH-PAT-HMU-singing-based-reality-show-om-shanti-om-5681198-PHO.html
 http://indianexpress.com/article/entertainment/bollywood/ranveer-singh-to-perform-at-the-premiere-of-baba-ramdev-show-om-shanti-om-4810262/
 http://www.radioandmusic.com/entertainment/editorial/news/161226-baba-ramdevs-patanjali-launch-singing
 http://www.exchange4media.com/tv/star-india-launches-new-channel-star-bharat_70178.html
 http://indiatoday.intoday.in/story/om-shanti-om-review-baba-ramdevs-new-bhajan-reality-show-is-more-about-bhakti-and-less-about-singing-lifetv/1/1036412.html
 Om Shanti Om (TV series)
 http://www.news18.com/news/movies/om-shanti-om-is-unique-in-all-aspects-shankar-mahadevan-1510659.html
 https://www.youtube.com/channel/UC1wFWySx1hAC6VFpxkvM2hQ/ Ath Entertainment Official YouTube Channel
 http://www.bollywoodhungama.com/moviemicro/cast/id/1059345 Bollywoodhungama.com

Television production companies of India
Film production companies of Delhi
Indian companies established in 2012